"What My Woman Can't Do" is a song by American country singer George Jones.  It became a #6 hit when it was released on Epic Records in 1973.

Background
"What My Woman Can't Do" was composed by Jones, his producer Billy Sherrill, Earl "Peanut" Montgomery, and Betty Tate.  The song praises the virtues of a loyal and loving wife who "brightens any room she walks inside."  The memorable a cappella opening features Jones voice singing the song's hook with his own voice multi-tracked.  The singer made an appearance on the television show The Midnight Special performing the song in 1973.  Likely the result of his wife Tammy Wynette's influence, Jones appearance had changed enormously from a few years before, with the now plump singer wearing more formal stage attire rather than the sparkling Nudie suits from his early days and sporting a styled pompadour instead of the crew cut that had been one of his trademarks for so long.

Jerry Lee Lewis would cover the song on his 1973 LP Sometimes a Memory Ain't Enough.

1973 songs
George Jones songs
Songs written by Earl Montgomery
Songs written by Billy Sherrill
Songs written by George Jones
Song recordings produced by Billy Sherrill
Epic Records singles